Mid Valley Secondary Center is a small, public combined junior high and senior high school located in Throop, Lackawanna County, Pennsylvania. It is the sole high school and junior high school operated by Mid Valley School District. In 2014, enrollment was reported as 786 pupils in 7th through 12th grades. The school employed 25 teachers (9-12). The school is a federally designated Title I School.

High school aged students may choose to attend Career Technology Center of Lackawanna County for training in various careers including: construction and mechanical trades. The Northeastern Educational Intermediate Unit, IU19, provides the district with a wide variety of services like specialized education for disabled students and hearing, speech and visual disability services and professional development for staff and faculty.

Extracurriculars
Mid Valley School District offers a wide variety of clubs, activities and an extensive, publicly funded sports program.

Sports
The district funds:

Varsity

Boys
Baseball - AA
Basketball - AA
Cross country - A
Football - AA
Golf - AA
Soccer - A
Tennis - AA
Track and field - AA

Girls
Basketball - AA
Cross country - A
Indoor track and field
Golf - AA
Soccer - A
Softball - AA
Tennis - AA
Track and field - AA

Junior high school sports

Boys
Baseball
Basketball
Cross country
Football
Soccer
Track and field

Girls
Basketball
Cross country
Soccer
Softball 
Track and field

According to PIAA directory July 2015

References

Schools in Lackawanna County, Pennsylvania
Public high schools in Pennsylvania